Islam in Central Sulawesi, a province of Indonesia, is the majority religion embraced by around 75% of the population, out of a total of 2,683,722 inhabitants (2011 projection figure, based on the 2010 census). The propagators of Islam were thought to enter the Central Sulawesi through neighboring regions, namely Bone, Wajo, and Mandar from the south and west routes, and through Gorontalo and Ternate from the north and east routes via Tomini Bay and Tolo Bay.

History 
The Islamic teachings were thought to have first spread to the region of Central Sulawesi in Buol dan Banggai, where both regions accepted Islam in the mid-16th century due to influences from Ternate. A king of Buol was noted to have an Islamic name, namely Eato Muhammad Tahir who ruled between 1540-1595.

At the beginning of the 17th century, Islam began to spread in the land of the Kailis propagated by Dato Karama (his real name Abdullah Raqie), who was believed to have come from Minangkabau. Dato Karama preached in the Palu area and its surroundings, and because of him the Kaili king named Pue Njidi converted to Islam. In the Parigi and surrounding areas, another Minangkabau preacher named Dato Mangaji (also called by the local title Tori Agama) was able to invite the Parigi king named Tori Kota and his son Magau Janggo to convert to Islam.

Education 
There is an Islamic higher education established in Central Sulawesi, the STAIN Datokarama Palu.

References 

 
Central Sulawesi